John Drew may refer to:

Government
John Drew (American politician) (1945–1997), American politician and businessman
John Drew (Australian politician) (1865–1947), Australian politician
John M. Drew (born 1973), Tax Collector of Nassau County, Florida

Sports
John Drew (baseball) (1883–1977), African-American sports executive
John Drew (basketball) (1954–2022), American basketball player
John Drew-Bear (born 1955), Venezuelan sailor

Others
John Drew (banker) (1734–1808), English banker
John Drew (Cherokee) (1796–1865), Confederate army officer during the American Civil War
John Drew Sr. (1827–1862), Irish-American stage actor and theatre manager
John Drew Jr. (1853–1927), American stage actor
John Drew (trader), 19th century trader in the Mackinac area
John Drew (astronomer) (1809–1857), English astronomer
John M. L. Drew (born 1966), British literary scholar

See also
Jon Drew, Canadian record producer and recording engineer
John Drewe (disambiguation)